The San Diego Strike Force is a professional indoor football team based in San Diego, California. It is a member of the Indoor Football League and began play in 2019 at Pechanga Arena in the city's Midway district. It is the second professional football team in San Diego that began play in spring 2019, after the San Diego Fleet of the Alliance of American Football, more than year after the departure of the NFL's San Diego Chargers in 2017.

The Strike Force is the third indoor team to play in San Diego, after the San Diego Riptide of af2 (2002–2005) and the San Diego Shockwave of the National Indoor Football League (2007). The team may have planned on being called the San Diego Lightning, as the organization's original email addresses and internal website links used that name.

Due to the effects of the COVID-19 pandemic, the team went dormant for the 2021 season.

History
The team was initially announced as a 2019 Indoor Football League expansion team in November 2018 and was owned by Roy Choi, who was also the owner of the IFL's Cedar Rapids River Kings. The team announced their colors as black, navy blue, silver, as well as their initial staff on December 17, 2018. Brian Cox, a former sports agent and quarterback, was hired as the general manager, while ex-Chargers defensive end Burt Grossman was named head coach.

The Strike Force struggled throughout its inaugural season with Grossman remarking the games were like he was "Southwestern College going to play Clemson or something." In their season opener against the Quad City Steamwheelers, they allowed 43 points in the first half and lost 67–49; Grossman attributed the team's struggles to a lack of headsets for the coaches. He eventually fired the defensive coordinator and released four players on defense; the offensive coordinator had also been fired two weeks prior, though Grossman noted both coaches were on the staff prior to his arrival. The Strike Force's first home game, a 65–44 defeat by the Tucson Sugar Skulls, saw a poor playing field consisting of carpet pieces held together with duct tape; four additional players were released a day later. After a 0–3 start, owner Choi brought in the River Kings' general manager Ryan Eucker to replace Cox. The team finished the season with a 1–13 record and last place in the league; their lone win was a 40–34 victory over the River Kings.

Following the 2019 season, Eucker announced the team would undergo a minor rebrand with a new logos and colors, choosing more military tones in olive green, black, silver, and brass to better represent the city. After playing one game, a 50–36 win over the Bismarck Bucks, the rest of the 2020 season was canceled due to the onset of the COVID-19 pandemic.

The Strike Force also withdrew from the 2021 season due to continued pandemic restrictions in California. During the hiatus, Eucker left the team and was replaced by football operations director Geno Gerbo as interim general manager by April 2021. In May 2021, Vivian Lin was announced as the team president and (incorrectly) as the first Asian American woman to be a president of a professional football team. That honor actually belongs to Kim Pegula - Owner and President of the Buffalo Bills (NFL) and Buffalo Sabres (NHL).

By November 2021, Gerbo had left the organization and Todd Durkin was named general manager. while Grossman was replaced as head coach by former Christian High School athletic director and football offensive coordinator, David Beezer. In March 2022, it was announced that the team had been sold to a new group of local investors, with Lin as the controlling owner, when Choi no longer wanted to be the owner. However Lin's group was unsuccessful in their purchase attempt, and ownership reverted back to Choi in November of 2022.

Roster

References

External links
 

American football teams in San Diego
Indoor Football League teams
American football teams established in 2018
2018 establishments in California